Itchimbía is a hill in Quito, Pichincha Province, Ecuador. It is surrounded to the east by Machángara River, a river that originates in the southern part of the city of Quito. Itchimbía is on the eastern/northeastern border of the center (downtown) of the city of Quito and the southeast border of the northern part.

Towards the west Itchimbía is connected to the hill of San Juan neighborhood, a neighborhood between central and northern Quito. Just west of the Itchimbía hill lies La Alameda, one of the largest parks inside the city of Quito, and in which there is an old astronomical observatory simply known as Observatorio Astronómico de Quito (OAQ). The observatory is nowadays owned by Escuela Politécnica Nacional (EPN). On the southwest there is also the Iglesía de San Blas, one of the better known historical churches of the center of Quito. To the south there is a creek that runs across the center of the city and whose water flows into Machángara River.

On the hill there is a park known as Parque Itchimbía or Parque del Itchimbía, which was previously owned by the municipality but is now run by a private environmentalist corporation known as Consorcio Ciudad-Ecogestión. The park includes a glass house atop the hill which serves as an exhibition center, conference room and museum and is known as :es:Centro Cultural Itchimbía. The exhibition center is owned by Centro Cultural Metropolitano de Quito. Benjamín Carrión Palace was completed in 1948.

The hill and some of its surrounding neighborhoods form a municipal administrative parish (cabildo) of the city of Quito.

External links
Official Web site of Consorcio Ciudad-Ecogestión
Official Web page of Centro Cultural Itchimbía on the official Web site of Centro Cultural Metropolitano de Quito
Official Web site of Observatorio Astronómico de Quito
Web page of Basílica del Voto Nacional on the official Web site of the Archdiocese of Quito 

Hills of Ecuador
Parishes of Quito Canton